Volvo Open may refer to a number of sporting events sponsored by Volvo.

Golf
Volvo Open, a golf tournament held in Sweden in 1970 and 1971
Volvo Open di Firenze, a golf tournament on the European Tour held in Italy from 1989 to 1992
Volvo Belgian Open, a golf tournament on the European Tour held in Belgium, and sponsored by Volvo from 1987 to 1989
Volvo China Open, a golf tournament that has been held in China since 1995
Volvo Finnish Open, a golf tournament on the Challenge Tour held in Finland between 1988 and 2004

Tennis
Jerusalem Volvo Open, a tennis tournament on the ATP Challenger Tour held in Israel
Swedish Open, a tennis tournament on the ATP and WTA tours held in Sweden that was known as the Volvo Open in 1988 and 1989
Volvo Car Open, a tennis tournament on the WTA Tour held in the United States
Volvo Monte Carlo Open, a tennis tournament on the ATP Tour held in Monaco
Volvo Women's Open, a tennis tournament on the WTA Tour held in Thailand

Other
Volvo Open 70, a class of racing yachts designed for the Volvo Ocean Race
Volvo Open Cup, figure skating competition held in Latvia

See also
Volvo Masters (disambiguation)